Rekle may refer to:

 Rekle, Podlaskie Voivodeship
 Rekle, Łódź Voivodeship

See also
 Rekkles (born 1996), Swedish League of Legends player who currently plays AD Carry for fnatic of the European League of Legends Championship Series (EU LCS)